The spectacled owl (Pulsatrix perspicillata) is a large tropical owl native to the neotropics. It is a resident breeder in forests from southern Mexico and Trinidad, through Central America, south to southern Brazil, Paraguay and northwestern Argentina. There are six subspecies. One is occasionally treated as a separate species called the short-browed or brown spectacled owl but the consensus is that it is still merely a race until more detailed analysis can be done.

Distribution and habitat

The spectacled owl is found in Mexico, Central America (Belize, Guatemala, El Salvador, Honduras, Nicaragua, Costa Rica, Panama), Trinidad and Tobago, and South America (Colombia, Venezuela, Suriname, French Guiana, Guyana, Paraguay, Ecuador, Peru, Bolivia, Brazil, Argentina). The spectacled owl is primarily a bird of tropical rainforests, being found mostly in areas where dense, old-growth forest is profuse. However, it may enter secondary habitats, such as forest edges, especially while hunting. On occasion, they have been found in dry forests, treed savanna plains, plantations and semi-open areas with trees.

Description

It is unmistakable in most of its range (except with other Pulsatrix owls) with blackish brown upperparts, head and upper breast, white facial markings and whitish to yellowish-ochre underparts. The eyes are yellow, the only Pulsatrix with this eye color, and the beak is pale. The juvenile is even more distinctive than the adult, being completely white apart from a chocolate brown facial disc. The head is typically darker than the back and mantle but the shade of this area besides the composition of the breast band is the main distinguishing external feature of the subspecies. Compared to the band-bellied owl (P. melanota), it is of similar or slightly larger size, but that species has dark eyes, white eyebrows and a brown chest band broken by buffy-whitish barring the rest of broadly the underparts being whitish with reddish-brown barring. The spectacled owl is generally found at lower elevations than the band-bellied but their ranges overlap or abut from Colombia to northern Bolivia. The tawny-browed owl (P. koeniswaldiana), found from northeastern Argentina to eastern Brazil, is fairly similar in appearance to the spectacled but is marked smaller with ochraceous-tawny from the eyebrows down to the belly and dark chestnut eyes. Each of the three currently recognized species also has a distinct song.

Vocal activity tends to be most prominent on calm, moonlit nights. The primary sound made by the spectacled owl consists of guttural knocking or tapping sounds with a popping effect: PUP-pup-pup-pup-po, POK pok pok bog bog bog bobobo or BOO Boo boo boo boo. Each progressive note becomes weaker and lower in pitch but faster in pace as the call continues. The male is the primary singer to proclaim a territory, often singing from the upper third of a tall tree. However, females also sing, uttering the same song but with a higher pitch. Duets between pairs have been heard on moonlit nights. Females also make a hawk-like scream with an emphasis on the drawn-out second syllable, ker-WHEEER, which has often been compared to a steam-whistle. Young spectacled owls beg with a harsh, high-pitched  call. In Colombia, an author noted that the song is similar to the tapping pattern of the great spotted woodpecker (Dendrocopos major). In Brazil, spectacled owls are known locally as "knocking owls".

Subspecies 
The following subspecies are currently recognized:
 Pulsatrix perspicillata boliviana (Kelso, 1933)- Distributed in Bolivia. Most similar to P. p. chapmani, with slightly lighter color on mantle than that race and a lighter, more buff underside color. The feathers appear to be relatively long on this race especially on the flanks, probably due to the cooler climates it inhabits.
 Pulsatrix perspicillata chapmani (Griscom, 1932)- Found from eastern Costa Rica to northwestern Ecuador. A relatively dark hued subspecies, sooty black on the back and rich tawny-rufous below.
 Pulsatrix perspicillata perspicillata (Latham, 1790)- By far the largest distribution of the races, found from northwestern South America to as far south as central Brazil and Bolivia. Nominate as described above.
 Pulsatrix perspicillata pulsatrix (Wied-Neuwied, 1820)- Or the "Short-browed Owl"; native to southeastern Brazil from about Bahia south to Rio Grande do Sul in the area of Aparados da Serra National Park and also bordering over into northeastern Argentina. This species has creamy-buff instead of white on the spectacles of the face. P. p. pulsatrix is lighter brown than in any other spectacled owl, with no contrasting darker plumage on the crown and nape as in other races. The breast band is brown and distinctly broken in the center. Main proposed difference (leading to it being considered a full species) is that territorial song is not as accelerated as in other races. Apparently, where the ranges of more typical spectacled owls overlap with the short-browed types, they do not seem to hybridize. This is the largest variety of Spectacled Owl.
 Pulsatrix perspicillata saturata (Ridgway, 1914)- Found from southern Mexico to northern Costa Rica. P. p. saturata differs from the typical spectacled owl only in that it is black on the head and the back, with black barring on the sides. It is one of the more distinct and widely described subspecies.
 Pulsatrix perspicillata trinitatis (Bangs & T. E. Penard, 1918)- Found on Trinidad and Tobago. This poorly-known race is sometimes treated as synonymous with the nominate by some authorities. Today, authorities believe that the race is extinct.

Behaviour

This species is largely nocturnal, starting activity right around the time of last light at dusk and usually being back on their roosts for the day around first light. It is a solitary, unsocial bird, usually roosting singly each day and only peaceable associating with others of their own species for reproductive purposes.

The spectacled owl is typically the largest and most dominant owl in its range, with the larger great horned owl (Bubo virginianus) rarely venturing into true rainforest habitats. Most hunting starts with the owl perched on a branch and scanning the area, then dropping with a quick pounce when prey is located. It preys principally on a wide array of mammals, eating almost anything that is nocturnally active. Various rodents may be primary but virtually any type of small mammal in its habitat is vulnerable. The primary food by far in Oaxaca, Mexico was the Peters's climbing rat (Tylomys nudicaudus) followed by mouse opossums (Marmosa ssp.) of unidentified species. Numerous bats, such as greater spear-nosed bats (Phyllostomus hastatus) and broad-eared bats (Nyctinomops laticaudatus), are also rather vulnerable apparently. Smaller monkeys such as tamarins (Saguinus ssp.) may be vulnerable to predation. Invertebrates are eaten regularly as well, second only in importance to mammals, and may be comprised mainly by caterpillars, but also crabs, snails, large insects, caterpillars and spiders. Insects may be gleaned directly from foliage while the large owls actively forage. Frogs are also recorded amongst their prey. Megascops ssp.). Little is known how spectacled owls interact with other owls but a study where playback of a number of owl species were played in Costa Rica, spectacled owls appeared to the least responsive, neither vocally stimulated by the calling of other owl species nor by playback of calls of their own species.

Reproduction

In Costa Rica, eggs are laid variously in the dry season (November–May), or at the start of the wet season (June–July). This owl typically nests in an unlined tree cavity but may also use the crutch of a large tree. Like all owls, they do not build a nest so just lay their nest on the bare surface of the wood given, usually rotting wood in the case of tree cavities. Spectacled owls lay 1-2 eggs, which are incubated entirely or almost so by the female for about 5 weeks. If two eggs are hatched, often only one of the chicks will survive, the smaller chick usually perishing via starvation or by aggression from the larger nestling. Chicks leave the nest for surrounding branches at about 5–6 weeks but cannot usually fly well at this stage. However, they tend to depend on their parents for several months after leaving the nest and may be cared for and fed for up to a year once fledged, inhibiting the pair's ability to have young the following year. Spectacled owls may breed while still in immature plumage since it may take up to five years before full adult plumage is obtained.

Status
The spectacled owl occurs over a very large range and is still a resident in much of its range. Due to this, it is classified as Least Concern by the IUCN. However, being a large, slow-maturing bird of prey with a strong sense of territoriality, it as a rule occurs at low densities. In areas where prey populations are hunted by people and habitats are destroyed or compromised, they may decrease. This is the likely source of extinction for an entire race on Trinidad (P. p. trinitatis). Occasionally, when roads are cut into the forest, they are killed by automobile collisions.

Gallery

References 

 A guide to the birds of Costa Rica by Stiles and Skutch 
Owl Profile- OwlPages.com
 Birds of Venezuela by Hilty,

External links

Stamps (for Belize, Honduras, Paraguay, and Suriname); Stamp-photo
Spectacled Owl photo gallery VIREO Photo-High Res
Spectacled Owl videos on the Internet Bird Collection

Pulsatrix
Birds of South America
Birds of Central America
Birds of Mexico
Articles containing video clips
Birds described in 1790